As a family thiosilanes refers to compounds of the form RSSiR'H2 with a S-Si bond between organic groups.

References

Organosilicon compounds
Thioethers